A gas hydrate pingo is a submarine dome structure formed by the accumulation of gas hydrates under the seafloor. Gas hydrate pingos resemble the pingo landforms found on land in periglacial regions.

Gas hydrate pingos may accumulate non-hydrate gas under pressure leading to explosions that forms craters. Crater depressions of this type have been found on the seafloor of Barents Sea. A trigger for the explosions may be drop in pressure as result of lowering of the sea level.

A study in the Norwegian Sea found that gas hydrate pingos were covered by bacterial mats and by Polychaete tubeworms that are associated with methane.

References

Barents Sea
Geomorphology
Ground freezing
Norwegian Sea
Palsas
Periglacial landforms
Geologic domes
Geography of the Arctic
Marine geology